Isaac Ellis Pedlow (February 6, 1861 – February 13, 1954) was an Irish-born merchant and political figure in Ontario, Canada. He represented Renfrew South in the House of Commons of Canada from 1917 to 1921 as a Laurier Liberal.

He was born in Lurgan, County Armagh, the son of Henry Pedlow and Mary Ellis, was educated in Ireland and came to Canada in 1883. In 1889, he married Annie Smith. Pedlow was a dry goods merchant in Renfrew, Ontario. He died in Renfrew at the age of 93.

References

Members of the House of Commons of Canada from Ontario
Laurier Liberals
1861 births
1954 deaths